Anlong Vil is a commune (khum) of Sangkae District in Battambang Province in north-western Cambodia.

Villages

 Chrab Veal
 Beng
 Anlong Vil
 Ou Muni Muoy
 Ou Muni Pir
 Chumnik
 Puk Chhma
 Spong
 Svay Kang

References

Communes of Battambang province
Sangkae District